Entoloma sordidulum  is a mushroom found in North America. Rhodophyllus sordidulus is a synonym.

See also
List of Entoloma species

References

Entolomataceae
Fungi of North America
Fungi described in 1955